Lakhimpur Telahi Kamalabaria College, also known as L.T.K. College, established in 1977, is a general degree college situated at Azad, in Lakhimpur district, Assam. This college is affiliated with the Dibrugarh University.

Departments

Science
Physics
Mathematics
Chemistry
Botany
Zoology
Home Science
Life history of BIKASH BHUYAN

Arts
Assamese
English
History
Physical Education
Economics
Philosophy
Political Science
Geography

References

External links
https://www.ltkcollege.ac.in/

Universities and colleges in Assam
Colleges affiliated to Dibrugarh University
Educational institutions established in 1977
1977 establishments in Assam